Pike County Airport  is three miles  northeast of Waverly, a village in Pike County, Ohio. The FAA's National Plan of Integrated Airport Systems for 2011–2015 categorized it as a general aviation facility.

Many U.S. airports use the same three-letter location identifier for the FAA and IATA, but this facility is EOP to the FAA and has no IATA code.

Facilities
Its one runway, 7/25, is 4,900 by 75 feet (1,494 x 23 m).

In the year ending June 30, 2009 the airport had 2,012 aircraft operations, average 167 per month: 99% general aviation and 1% military. Six single-engine aircraft were then based at the airport.

References

External links 
 PikeCountyAirport.wordpress.com
 Aerial photo as of 23 March 1994 from USGS The National Map
 

Airports in Ohio
Buildings and structures in Pike County, Ohio
Transportation in Pike County, Ohio